The 2022 NCAA Division I softball season, part of college softball in the United States organized by the National Collegiate Athletic Association (NCAA) at the Division I level, began in February 2022. The season progressed through the regular season, many conference tournaments and championship series, and concluded with the 2022 NCAA Division I softball tournament and 2022 Women's College World Series. The Women's College World Series, consisting of the eight remaining teams in the NCAA Tournament and held annually in Oklahoma City, Oklahoma, at ASA Hall of Fame Stadium, ended in June 2022.

Realignment

The following conference moves for the 2022 season were announced:
 Five schools left the Southland Conference. Abilene Christian, Lamar, Sam Houston, and Stephen F. Austin moved to the WAC, and Central Arkansas left for the ASUN.
 The Mid-Eastern Athletic Conference lost three members. Bethune–Cookman and Florida A&M joined the Southwestern Athletic Conference, and North Carolina A&T joined the Big South Conference.
 The Ohio Valley Conference lost Eastern Kentucky and Jacksonville State to the ASUN.
 The Summit League gained St. Thomas from NCAA Division III's Minnesota Intercollegiate Athletic Conference after the reception of a waiver for a direct transition to D-I.

Season outlook

Conference standings

All-America Teams
The following players were members of the All-American Teams.

First Team

Second Team

Third Team

Coaching changes
This table lists programs that changed head coaches at any point from the first day of the 2022 season until the day before the first day of the 2023 season.

See also
2022 NCAA Division I baseball season

References